Lamothe can be a name (or part of a name) of communes in France or a surname of people.

Communes
 Lamothe, Landes, in the Landes département 
 Lamothe, Haute-Loire, in the Haute-Loire département 
 Bromont-Lamothe, in the Puy-de-Dôme département
 Lamothe-Capdeville, in the Tarn-et-Garonne département
 Lamothe-Cassel, in the Lot département
 Lamothe-Cumont, in the Tarn-et-Garonne département
 Lamothe-en-Blaisy, in the Haute-Marne département
 Lamothe-Fénelon, in the Lot département
 Lamothe-Goas, in the Gers département
 Lamothe-Landerron, in the Gironde département
 Lamothe-Montravel, in the Dordogne département

People
 André LaMothe, American computer scientist and author
 Arthur Lamothe (1928–2013), Canadian-French film director and producer
 Denis Lamothe, Canadian politician
 Dieudonné LaMothe (born 1954), Haitian long-distance runner
 Esteban Lamothe (born 1977), Argentine actor
 Ferdinand Joseph LaMothe (c. 1890–1941), American musician known professionally as Jelly Roll Morton
 Georges Lamothe (1842–1894), French composer and organist
 Gisou Lamothe (1935–2020), Haitian painter and sculptor
 Jean-Baptiste-Gustave Lamothe (1856–1922), Canadian judge and lawyer
 John Dominique LaMothe (1868–1928), British-American bishop and missionary
 Joseph Lamothe, Haitian politician and briefly interim President of Haiti in 1879
 Laurent Lamothe (born 1972), Haitian politician, economist and businessman
 Louis Lamothe (1822–1869), French painter and academic
 Ludovic Lamothe (1882–1953), Haitian composer and pianist
 Lysane Blanchette-Lamothe (born 1984), Canadian politician
 Marc Lamothe (born 1974), Canadian ice hockey player
 Pierre Lamothe (born 1997), Canadian soccer player
 Romeo Lamothe (1914–1991), Canadian politician and teacher
 Ron Lamothe (born 1968), American film director and producer
 Serge Lamothe (born 1963), Canadian writer
 Willie Lamothe (1920–1992), Canadian musician and actor